The New South Wales 42 class was a class of diesel locomotives built by Clyde Engineering, Granville for the New South Wales Department of Railways in 1955/56.

History

The design was based on the Electro-Motive Diesel EMD F9 locomotive, and was very similar to the GM 12 class then being built by Clyde Engineering for the Commonwealth Railways.

The locos initially worked express passenger services including the Brisbane Limited, Intercapital Daylight and Melbourne Limited and later the Southern Aurora and Spirit of Progress. As newer locomotives arrived they were concentrated on the Main South line operating freight services.

By April 1978, the Goulburn branch of the Australian Federated Union of Locomotive Enginemen had placed a ban on operating the 42 class as lead engines due to cab conditions. In 1980, to overcome those problems, 4201 had its cab upgraded during an overhaul but, with their replacement imminent, it was decided not to modify the rest of the class. All were withdrawn in 1983.

Preservation
Three have been preserved. A fourth was preserved, but this has since been mostly cut up:
4201 was acquired by the NSW Rail Museum. It has been used extensively on charters across the state and ventured interstate to Melbourne. It retains the green and yellow livery it received for the 125th anniversary of NSW railways in 1980. As of April 2021 it was in operational condition.
4203 was acquired by a Caravan City Cowra, Cowra and placed on display alongside the Mid-Western Highway at the entrance to the War, Rail, Rural Museum. It was later sold and the body was cut into three sections; while the central section was scrapped, O'Donohughes Pub in Emu Plains bought the cab and rearmost section of the body and welded them together for use as playground equipment. The bogies and fuel tank were sold to enthusiast groups for use as spare parts.
4204 was acquired by the Lachlan Valley Railway, After being restored by apprentices at Clyde Engineering, Kelso in 1986, it has been used extensively on charters across the state and on freight services by Lachlan Valley Rail Freight. In the late 90s it was limited to operations pending overhaul at Lachlan Valley Railway's Cowra Rail Heritage centre, it returned to Service early 2010 following overhaul and outshopped back into its original Special Maroon livery, As at December 2018 it was used regularly on mainline tour trains and often hired to Southern Shorthaul Railroad for use on infrastructure trains in New South Wales and Victoria. In October 2019, 4204 returned to service to run a charter train to Capertee from Lithgow after being away for overhaul and repainting.
4206 was purchased by Dorrigo Steam Railway & Museum. After being used extensively on the Dorrigo line hauling 40 trains from Glenreagh to Dorrigo in the 1980s, it is currently stored, it was in operational condition but open storage has taken its toll.

References

Further reading
"The 42 Class of NSW" Australian Railway Historical Society Bulletin January/February 1985 pages 1–24;26–43

 Locomotives of Australia (Oberg) 2011 edition Rosenberg Publishers pages 283–287.

External links

Clyde Engineering locomotives
Co-Co locomotives
Diesel locomotives of New South Wales
Railway locomotives introduced in 1955
Standard gauge locomotives of Australia
Diesel-electric locomotives of Australia
Streamlined diesel locomotives